Dùn Uragaig is a clifftop promontory fort located on the Inner Hebridean island of Colonsay, Scotland.

The fort overlooks the inlet of Port nam Fliuchan.

References

Archaeological sites in the Southern Inner Hebrides
Promontory forts in Scotland
Colonsay
Former populated places in Scotland